The Conquest of Former Yan by Former Qin was a military campaign launched by the Former Qin dynasty against the Former Yan dynasty from late 369 to late 370 during the Sixteen Kingdoms period of China. The campaign resulted in the fall of Former Yan and established Former Qin's supremacy over northern China.

References

 Fang, Xuanling (ed.) (648). Book of Jin (Jin Shu).
 Sima, Guang (1084). Zizhi Tongjian.
 Cui, Hong (501-522). Spring and Autumn Annals of the Sixteen Kingdoms (Shiliuguo Chunqiu)

Conflicts in 369
Conflicts in 370
Former Qin
Former Yan
zh:前秦滅前燕之戰